The Desert Classic (currently known as The American Express for sponsorship reasons;  previously known as the CareerBuilder Challenge, Palm Springs Golf Classic, the Bob Hope Desert Classic, the Bob Hope Chrysler Classic, and the Humana Challenge) is a professional golf tournament in southern California on the PGA Tour. Played in mid-winter in the Coachella Valley (greater Palm Springs), it is part of the tour's early season "West Coast Swing."

It previously had five rounds of competition (90 holes) rather than the standard of four rounds, and was known for its celebrity pro-am. For many years, the event was named for and hosted by entertainer Bob Hope and featured a number of celebrity participants.

In 2012, the Desert Classic changed to a traditional 72-hole format over three different courses with a 54-hole cut, similar to the AT&T Pebble Beach Pro-Am, and ended their celebrity pro-am. The tournament is organized by the nonprofit Impact Through Golf, which took over from Desert Classic Charities in 2020.

History
Founded in 1960 as the Palm Springs Golf Classic, the tournament evolved from the Thunderbird Invitational that was held in Palm Springs the previous six years, from 1954 to 1959, but with a much smaller purse. The event was renamed the Bob Hope Desert Classic in 1965 and the Bob Hope Chrysler Classic in 1986.

Until 2012, its format remained unique among PGA Tour events, being played over five days and four different courses. In its first three years, the tournament was played at Thunderbird Country Club and Tamarisk Country Club, both in Rancho Mirage; Bermuda Dunes Country Club in Bermuda Dunes; and Indian Wells Country Club in Indian Wells. Bermuda Dunes was used through 2009 and Indian Wells through 2005. In 1963 Eldorado Country Club, also in Indian Wells, replaced Thunderbird Country Club. From 1964 until 1968 La Quinta Country Club in La Quinta, replaced Tamarisk Country Club, but in 1969 Tamarisk Country Club rejoined the event and alternated annually with Eldorado Country Club until 1986 (Tamarisk Country Club's last turn being in 1985).

An evolution towards courses more suited to modern professionals began in 1987. From 1987 until 1994, and again from 1998 to the present, a course at PGA West in La Quinta, (the TPC Stadium Golf Course in 1987 and the Arnold Palmer Private Course thereafter) became a permanent member of the roster; from 1995–97, Indian Ridge Country Club in Palm Desert replaced PGA West. To make room for a new permanent member, Eldorado Country Club and La Quinta Country Club alternated from 1987–89 (Eldorado being used in 87 and 89), after which Eldorado Country Club was dropped from the roster. From 1990–2003 Tamarisk Country Club and La Quinta Country Club followed a "1–2" alternating arrangement, where Tamarisk was played the first year and La Quinta CC the next two; this pattern was deviated from when Tamarisk was used in 2004 (a La Quinta CC year by the pattern), although the 2005, 2006 and 2007 events were then played at La Quinta CC.

In early 2005 a local charitable foundation gave its new course, The Classic Club in Palm Desert (an Arnold Palmer-designed track) to the tournament, making the Bob Hope Chrysler Classic the only event on the PGA Tour that owns its own facility. The Classic Club took the place of Indian Wells in 2006, but the course was dropped from the Hope course field after the 2008 event, citing players concerns over high winds.

The 2009 course rotation consisted of the Arnold Palmer Private Course and the Nicklaus Private Course (both at PGA West in La Quinta), SilverRock Resort (in La Quinta), and the Bermuda Dunes Country Club. In 2010, La Quinta CC replaced Bermuda Dunes CC. In 2012, SilverRock Resort dropped from the rotation due to the tournament shortening to 72 holes. In 2016, the main course was Pete Dye's PGA West Stadium Course, and also used PGA West’s Nicklaus Tournament course (originally designed for the 1991 Ryder Cup, the European Broadcasting Union objected because of the European domination of the tournament and a nine-hour time difference from Central European Time was inconvenient;  the tournament moved east where only a six-hour time difference allowed the event to air in primetime hours), and La Quinta Country Club in the first three rounds.

The tradition of choosing the tournament's "Classic Girls" from among the area's collegians began in those early years, with the earliest tournaments having a celebrity dubbed "Classic Queen."  The earliest titleholders included Debbie Reynolds, Jane Powell, and Jill St. John. The queens of the 1970s included Barbara Eden and Lynda Carter.

The Classic's biggest draw, both then and now, has been the celebrity Pro-am competition which has attracted some of the era's biggest celebrities.  According to the official website, those celebrities have included:
 Bing Crosby
 Burt Lancaster
 Kirk Douglas
 Phil Harris
 Desi Arnaz (one of the founders of the aforementioned Indian Wells Country Club)
 Ray Bolger
 Hoagy Carmichael
 Glen Campbell
 Don Adams
 Dwight Eisenhower (the first U.S. President to play in the pro-am)

The first edition in 1960 was won by Arnold Palmer at 338 (–22), a record that stood for twenty years.
He had won the last Thunderbird event the previous year, which had a $15,000 purse with a winner's share of $1,500. The purse in 1960 was over six times larger at $100,000, and the $12,000 first prize was Palmer's biggest check to date.

Hope, who was possibly Hollywood's greatest golfer, added his name to the tournament in 1965, and became its chairman of the board.

The 1970s saw stars like Frank Sinatra make their debuts. Less than three weeks out of office, Gerald Ford played his first pro-am in 1977, making him the second former president to play in the tournament. More recently celebrities such as Jimmy Fallon, Don Cheadle, and Samuel L. Jackson have competed in the Bob Hope Chrysler Classic, before its subsequent renames.

History was made at the tournament in 1995 when the pro-am team of Bill Clinton, George H. W. Bush, Gerald Ford, Bob Hope and defending champion Scott Hoch teed up for the tournament's opening round.  The event marked the first time a sitting president – Clinton – had played during a PGA Tour event and perhaps the first time three presidents had ever played together.

Its long history has made the event synonymous with golf in the Coachella Valley. Additionally, the allure of Hope's name, even after his death, has convinced the Hope estate, tournament organizers and corporate sponsor Chrysler to include the legendary entertainer's name on the tournament for as long as a substantial portion of its proceeds are given to charities.

Before 2012, the tournament's five-round format was a "tough sell" for many players, such as Tiger Woods, who has never played there. It took place over five days, four of which include celebrity players. That meant rounds take far longer and the presence of so many spectators out to catch a glimpse of their favorite TV, film or music star, can turn even an early round into a far more informal endeavor, which many golfers did not enjoy.

Starting in 2012, the tournament was narrowed to a four-round event played on three courses with a 54-hole cut.  The tournament is the first continental stop of the calendar year, but is still a hard sell because network television coverage of the PGA Tour starts the ensuing week.

The tournament was called the Bob Hope Chrysler Classic until the 2009 tournament, when George Lopez was let go as host and Chrysler dropped their name from the tournament's name, but continued to sponsor the tournament. Instead, the tournament was hosted by the only 5-time winner of the event, Arnold Palmer, for the tournament's 50th anniversary. In 2010, baseball Hall of Famer Yogi Berra served as the first "Classic Ambassador".

Professional field
The professional field consists of 156 players selected using (slightly reordered) standard eligibility rankings except that the following are also eligible:
 The Players Championship winners prior to 1996
 PGA Tour members who played on the most recent Ryder Cup and Presidents Cup teams of both sides.
 Winners of the tournament prior to 1999 and in the previous ten seasons
There is no open qualifying for the tournament.

Tournament hosts

Winners

Note: Green highlight indicates scoring records.
Source:

Multiple winners
Nine men have won this tournament more than once through 2023.
 5 wins
 Arnold Palmer: 1960, 1962, 1968, 1971, 1973
 2 wins
 Billy Casper: 1965, 1969
 John Cook: 1992, 1997
 Bill Haas: 2010, 2015
 John Mahaffey: 1979, 1984
 Phil Mickelson: 2002, 2004
 Johnny Miller: 1975, 1976
 Corey Pavin: 1987, 1991
 Hudson Swafford: 2017, 2022
 Jon Rahm: 2018, 2023

Tournament highlights
 1960: Arnold Palmer wins the inaugural version of the tournament by three shots over Fred Hawkins. Joe Campbell earned $50,000 in unofficial money for scoring a hole-in-one on the fifth hole of the Tamarisk Country Club.
 1963: Jack Nicklaus defeats Gary Player 65 to 73 in an 18-hole playoff for the tournament title.
 1964: 53-year-old Jimmy Demaret who rarely played competitive golf any more finishes regulation play tied for first with Tommy Jacobs but loses on the second hole of sudden death.
 1967: Club professional Tom Nieporte birdies the 90th hole to beat Doug Sanders by one shot.
 1972: Bob Rosburg wins for the first time since the 1961 Bing Crosby National Pro-Am. He beats Lanny Wadkins by one shot.
 1973: Arnold Palmer wins the tournament for a fifth time by two shots over Jack Nicklaus and Johnny Miller. It is Palmer's final PGA Tour triumph.
 1976: Johnny Miller shoots a final round 63 to successfully defend his Bob Hope title. He wins by 3 shots over Rik Massengale.
 1980: Craig Stadler wins for the first-time on the PGA Tour. He beats  Tom Purtzer and Mike Sullivan by 2 shots.
 1982: Ed Fiori, expecting to become a first-time father any day, rolls in a 35-foot birdie putt on the second hole of a sudden death playoff to defeat Tom Kite.
 1985: Lanny Wadkins plays the last five holes of regulation in five under par to tie Craig Stadler, then goes on to beat him on the fifth hole of a sudden death playoff.
 1989: Steve Jones becomes the first golfer since Gil Morgan in 1983 to sweep the first two events of the PGA Tour Schedule. He defeats Paul Azinger and Sandy Lyle on the first hole of a sudden death playoff.
 1990: Peter Jacobsen birdies the 90th hole to win the Hope by one shot over Brian Tennyson and Scott Simpson after NBC golf announcer Johnny Miller talked about how easy it would have been for Jacobsen to choke his second shot to the par-5 finishing hole.
 1991: Corey Pavin holes a 35-foot wedge shot on the first hole of sudden death to defeat Mark O'Meara.
 1992: John Cook holes a chip shot from 100-feet to defeat Gene Sauers in sudden death. The playoff, originally composed of five players, also involved Tom Kite, Mark O'Meara, and Rick Fehr.
 1993: Tom Kite, who had twice previously lost the tournament in playoffs, shoots 325, a PGA Tour record for 90 holes at the time. He beats Rick Fehr by 6 shots.
 1999: David Duval shoots a final round 59 to beat Steve Pate by one shot.
 2001 Joe Durant shoots a record score for a 90-hole PGA tournament with a 36-under-par score of 324 (65-61-67-66-65).
 2003: Mike Weir birdies the final three holes to win by two shots over Jay Haas.
 2009: Pat Perez shoots 124 to set a new PGA Tour record for the first 36 holes of a tournament. He goes on to win the Hope by three shots over John Merrick.
 2011: In just his fifth PGA Tour start and second as a Tour member, Jhonattan Vegas became the first Venezuelan to win on the PGA Tour. It was also the last year the tournament was a five-round event.
 2014: Patrick Reed shot 63s in his first three rounds, a PGA Tour record 27-under-par for 54 holes.
 2017: Adam Hadwin shot a 59 in the third round. He is the first Canadian on the PGA Tour to accomplish this and only the third player to shoot 59 on a par-72 course.

Records
 Low 18-Hole record 59 – David Duval (1999), Adam Hadwin (2017)
 Low 36-Hole record 123 – Steve Stricker (2009)
 Low 54-Hole record 189 – Patrick Reed (2014)
 Low 72-Hole record 259 – Joe Durant (2001)
 Low 90-Hole record 324 – Joe Durant (2001) (PGA Tour record)
 High winning score 349 – Doug Sanders (1966), Tom Nieporte (1967)
 High finish by winner 72 – Billy Casper (1965)
 Low finish by winner 59 – David Duval (1999)
 Low start by winner 63 – Jay Haas (1988)
 High start by winner 76 – Tom Nieporte (1967), Steve Jones (1989)
 Largest victory margin 6 strokes – Rik Massengale (1977), Tom Kite (1993)
 Low cut 273 – 15-under-par (2009) (PGA Tour record)
 Wire to wire winners – Rik Massengale (1977), Bruce Lietzke (1981)
 Best turn around  – Jonathan Kaye (1999) 2nd – 83 3rd – 62

Timeline of courses used

Legend:

Television broadcast and cable history
From the mid-1960s through 1998, NBC broadcast the fourth and fifth rounds of the tournament. ABC took over the coverage in 1999 through 2006, with CBS covering the tournament in 2003 due to ABC's involvement with Super Bowl XXXVII.

On the cable side, the first three rounds were covered by ESPN through 2002.  From 2003–06, USA Network covered the early action.

Beginning in 2007, the tournament lost its network coverage and the Golf Channel showed all five rounds on cable television.  Even with the move to four rounds and the reduction in celebrity involvement, the tournament is still exclusive to cable, as it is usually the last full-field stop restricted to cable-only coverage, as network television coverage of the PGA Tour currently does not begin until the week after the NFL's Conference Championship Games, which is the week before the Super Bowl.

Coverage style
Prior to 2007, USA and ESPN/ABC consistently covered all four courses used for the event, with the primary camera crew covering PGA West, but live coverage still emanating from the other courses.  However, when Golf Channel took over coverage, the network only assigned live coverage to PGA West (both the Palmer and Nicklaus courses). All other courses used did not receive live coverage at all, with an hourly highlights package sent in and played, but none of it live.  This has been the approach consistently taken by Golf Channel in regards to tournaments with multiple courses, including the Pebble Beach National Pro-Am and the Walt Disney World Golf Classic.

References

External links

Coverage on the PGA Tour's website

PGA Tour events
Golf in California
Sports competitions in California
Sports in Riverside County, California
La Quinta, California
Pro–am golf tournaments
Recurring sporting events established in 1960
1960 establishments in California